The Kölner Runde (Cologne Round Table) is a cooperation of six of Germany's leading student organizations, namely AIESEC, bonding, BDSU (Confederation of German Junior Enterprises, see also JADE), ELSA, MARKET TEAM, and MTP. 
Founded in 1991, it has grown to an important platform for inter-organizational knowledge management.

External links
 Kölner Runde
Student organisations in Germany
1991 establishments in Germany
Student societies in Germany
Organizations established in 1991
Organisations based in Cologne